The Women's England Hockey League is a field hockey league organised by England Hockey that features women's teams from England.  From 2011-2020 it was sponsored by Investec and was referred to as the Investec Women's Hockey League.

Format

Regular season
There are 62 teams in the league, the top tier consists of a Premier Division of 12 teams. Below this is tier two, which consists of two ten team Division One regional teams (North and South). The third tier consists of three regional conferences North, West, and East, all consisting of ten teams. The teams play each other home and away during an 18 week season from September to April. The league has a winter break between December and February. At the end of the season there are a series of play-offs that decide which teams are promoted and relegated and which team finish as champions.  The winners of the Premier Division regular season automatically qualify to play in the EuroHockey Club Champions Cup.

League Finals Weekend
The top four Premier Division teams from the regular season qualify for the League Finals Weekend. The team that wins this tournament will be overall champions of the Women's England Hockey League and will qualify to play in the EuroHockey Club Champions Cup. If the team finishing top of the Premier Division at the end of the regular season also wins the League Finals Weekend tournament, the tournament runners-up will qualify as England's second team in the EuroHockey Club Champions Cup.

2022–23 teams

Past winners
The Women's National League was introduced for the first time in 1989–90.  and the inaugural Women's National League title sponsored by Typhoo was won by Slough.

Premier Division

Premiership Tournament/Super Cup

See also
England Hockey Women's Championship Cup
Men's England Hockey League
England Hockey Men's Championship Cup

References

 
!
England
Women's field hockey competitions in England
1989 establishments in England
Sports leagues established in 1989